This List of Bavarian noble families contains all 338 Bavarian aristocratic families named in 1605 by Siebmacher as well as further additions.

The list is an alphabetical overview of Bavarian nobility. It contains information about name variants, ancestry, extent and well-known personalities of the line. Where no coat of arms is available, the file position from Siebmacher's 1605 Book of Coats of Arms is given as follows: page number of the coat of arms plate and position of the coat of arms on the plate (the page numbers of reprints are not used).

A

B

C

D

E

F

G

H

I

J

K

L

M

N

O

P

R

S

T

U

V

W

Z

Sources

References

General works on the knighthood in Bavaria 
 Johann Siebmacher (Begr.), Horst Appuhn (ed.): Johann Siebmachers Coat of armsbuch von 1605. Orbis, Munich,  1999,

Distribution of individual families 
 August Gebessler: Stadt und Landkreis Bayreuth. München 1959.
 August Gebessler: Stadt und Landkreis Hof. München 1960.
 B. Röttger: Die Kunstdenkmäler von Bayern. Landkreis Wunsiedel und Stadtkreis Marktredwitz. Munich, 1954.

Genealogical works 
 Johann Biedermann: Geschlechts=Register Der Reichs Frey unmittelbaren Ritterschafft Landes zu Francken löblichen Orts Ottenwald … Kulmbach 1751.
 Harald Stark: Die Familie Notthafft – auf Spurensuche im Egerland, in Bayern und Schwaben. Weißenstadt 2006, .

External links 

 Scheiblersches Wappenbuch: Scheiblersches Wappenbuch mit bayrischen Wappen in den Commons
 Bertschi, Nikolaus: Wappenbuch besonders deutscher Geschlechter - BSB Cod.icon. 308, Augsburg 1515 - 1650
 Wappenbuch des churbayrischen Adels (Copie eines Originals von 1560), Vol. 1 - BSB Cgm 1508, S.l. 1700

 
Lists of German nobility
Bavaria